Adyeville is an unincorporated community in Clark Township, Perry County, in the U.S. state of Indiana.

History
A post office was established at Adyeville in 1862, and remained in operation until 1966. Andrew J. Adye, the first postmaster, gave the community his name. Adyeville was platted in 1873.

Geography

References

Unincorporated communities in Perry County, Indiana
Unincorporated communities in Indiana